Pablo Daniel Brandán (born 5 March 1983) is an Argentine former footballer and manager.

Career
Brandán was born in Merlo. He won the 2008–09 Liga I edition with Unirea Urziceni, under the coaching of Dan Petrescu. In the same season he was selected the Liga I left back of the year.

In September 2010 he signed a contract with Steaua București before follow teammates from Unirea Urziceni: Galamaz, Ricardo, Marinescu, Apostol and Bilașco who signed one week earlier. He was part of the team which played in the 2009–10 UEFA Champions League group stage.

In the 2011–12 Liga I season, Brandán began being used as a central midfielder and central defender, although his main post is on the left flank of the defence. Brandán proved to be a playmaker, giving 3 goal assists in the season and 4 assists in the 2011–12 UEFA Europa League, but did not manage to score his first goal for Steaua.

In February 2012, he was transferred to Chinese team Liaoning Whowin.

In January 2014, he signed a contract with Beitar Jerusalem in which he scored 1 goal in 14 league appearances. He then moved back to Romania where he won the Romanian championship once again in 2016–17 with FC Viitorul Constanța.

Honours
Huracán
 Primera B Nacional: 1999–00
Independiente
 Primera División: 2002 Apertura
Unirea Urziceni
 Liga I: 2008–09
Steaua București
 Cupa României: 2010–11
ASA Târgu Mureș
 Supercupa României: 2015
Viitorul Constanța
 Liga I: 2016–17

Individual
Gazeta Sporturilor Foreign Player of the Year in Romania: 2009

Notes

References

External links
 Official FCSB profile  
 
 Pablo Brandán at BDFA.com.ar 
 
 gsp.ro
 

1983 births
Living people
Association football midfielders
Association football fullbacks
Argentine footballers
Argentine expatriate footballers
Argentina under-20 international footballers
Sportspeople from Buenos Aires Province
Club Atlético Huracán footballers
Deportivo Alavés players
Burgos CF footballers
Club Atlético Independiente footballers
Argentinos Juniors footballers
Instituto footballers
FC Unirea Urziceni players
FC Steaua București players
Liaoning F.C. players
Beitar Jerusalem F.C. players
CS Universitatea Craiova players
ASA 2013 Târgu Mureș players
FC Viitorul Constanța players
Argentine Primera División players
Primera Nacional players
La Liga players
Liga I players
Chinese Super League players
Israeli Premier League players
Argentine expatriate sportspeople in Spain
Expatriate footballers in Romania
Expatriate footballers in China
Expatriate footballers in Israel
Argentine football managers